Wisting may refer to:
 Wisting (TV series), Norwegian television series
 William Wisting, fictional detective created by Jørn Lier Horst
 Oscar Wisting (1871–1936), Norwegian polar explorer
 Mount Wisting, summit in Antarctica